Thomas Edward Ackerman (born September 14, 1943) is an American cinematographer. In 2009, Ackerman joined the faculty of the University of North Carolina School of the Arts School of Filmmaking.

Career in Higher Education (2008-Present)
Between 2008  and 2009  Ackerman joined the faculty of the University of North Carolina School of the Arts School of Filmmaking. In the subsequent years, likely bolstered in some part by Ackerman’s influence, Michael Chapman, A.S.C.  began teaching at the conservatory. Ackerman, drawing from his years of experience following modest beginnings, engages upper-level cinematography students through both hands on instruction and lectures.  In 2015, Ackerman debuted an autobiographical course “ Pathways: A Career in Film” through lectures and screenings. 

Ackerman succeeded cinematography department chair David Elkins, S.O.C.  following Elkins’ retirement in 2019.

Filmography

References

External links
 
 
 International Cinematographer's Guild: Member Spotlight: Thomas Ackerman, ASC, with an extensive interview with biographical details.

Living people
American cinematographers
Artists from Cedar Rapids, Iowa
1948 births